Top Seed is the third studio album by South Korean boy group Infinite. It was released on January 8, 2018 by Woollim Entertainment with the lead single "Tell Me". Top Seed was the group's first full album release since Season 2 (2014) and the group's first release since Infinite Only (2016). It marked the group's first release as a six-member group after former member Hoya left the group in August 2017. It also serves as their final release before their members' departure from Woollim Entertainment.

Background and release
While fanmeeting on March 3, 2017 an unexpected black-and-white teaser video featuring individual shots and ended with the words "2017 May", which confirmed their next comeback schedule. On March 29, Woollim Entertainment announced that the filming of music video for new title track on March 30 had been postponed due to Sungkyu rib injury.

On May 16, Woollim Entertainment confirmed that Infinite comeback schedule in May had been postponed due Sungkyu has not fully recovered from his injury and continue to receive treatment.

On August 30, Following the departure of Hoya, Woollim Entertainment announced that Infinite will try making comeback in 2017 after the members wrap up their individual activities to prepare new album.

On November 21, Woollim Entertainment confirmed that Infinite will make a comeback in January 2018 and current they recording their new music and making some modifications.

On December 11, an Woollim Entertainment representative revealed that the group had completed filming a music video for the album's title track.

Woollim Entertainment began releasing video teasers on January 2 at Midnight KST and confirmed Infinite would return on January 8 with their third full album and the lead single "Tell Me". In the music video teaser for "Tell Me", the men appear to be in a dream, and some choreography is shown. "Tell Me" is directed by Sunny Visual, who directed "Undoable" by Jan Dong-eun, "What You Like" bg Lee Gi-kwang, and "Only U" by Laboum.

Composition
The title track "Tell Me" was written and composed by BLSSD, formerly known as Bee of the songwriting team Rphabet; he wrote the single, the instrumental intro "Begin" and co-wrote "Wind", an ebullient synthpop track.

The sixth track "Pray" was written and composed by SWEETUNE. Dongwoo also made the rap lyrics on "Pray (Mattel's Sorrow)".

The album features three solo tracks by the members Dongwoo, L, and Sungjong. Dongwoo composed his solo track "TGIF" with GALLERY.  L composed his solo track "Reminsce" with Jeong Min-ji. He describes his song "very lyrical". He sang the band version, but the original for the fans. Sungjong's solo track "Love Song" was written by Misung.

Promotions
The group held their comeback showcase for its third studio album, "Top Seed", at Blue Square Hall in central Seoul on January 8, 2018. It was broadcast live on Naver's V-Live.

The group started to performed their title track "Tell Me" on January 9, on Mnet M! Countdown and continue to perform on KBS2 Music Bank, MBC Music Core, SBS Inkigayo, and MBC Music Show Champion. They also performed their b-side track "No More" for their comeback stage. They won five times on music programs.

The members also guest on variety shows such as Weekly Idol, Comedy Big League, Battle Trip, and Hello Counselor.

Track listing

Charts

Weekly charts

Monthly charts

Sales

Release history

References

Infinite (group) albums
2018 albums
Korean-language albums